Wojciech Błyszko (born 5 October 1999) is a Polish professional footballer who plays as a centre-back for Polish club Wisła Puławy.

Club career
On 7 September 2020, he joined Stal Mielec on a season-long loan with an option to buy.

In June 2021, he signed for Motor Lublin on a one-year contract with an option for a second year.

On 2 June 2022, Błyszko moved to newly promoted I liga side Chojniczanka Chojnice on two-year deal with a one-year extension option. He left the club by mutual consent on 1 February 2023.

Two days later, Błyszko joined II liga club Wisła Puławy on a deal until the end of the season.

References

External links
Interview with Wojciech Błyszko jagiellonia.pl

1999 births
People from Drawsko Pomorskie
Sportspeople from West Pomeranian Voivodeship
Living people
Polish footballers
Association football central defenders
Błękitni Stargard players
Jagiellonia Białystok players
Stal Mielec players
Motor Lublin players
Chojniczanka Chojnice players
Wisła Puławy players
Ekstraklasa players
I liga players
II liga players
Polish expatriate footballers
Expatriate footballers in Germany
Polish expatriate sportspeople in Germany